Herpetogramma centrostrigalis is a moth in the family Crambidae. It was described by Stephens in 1934. The species was described from a single specimen taken in Devon, England.

The wingspan is 29–31 mm.

References

Moths described in 1934
Herpetogramma
Moths of Europe